Romana Hejdová (born 9 May 1988) is a Czech basketball player who competed in the 2008 Summer Olympics.

References

External links
 
 
 
 
 

1988 births
Living people
Czech women's basketball players
Olympic basketball players of the Czech Republic
Basketball players at the 2008 Summer Olympics
Sportspeople from Brno
Point guards
Shooting guards